Just Between the Two of Us is a duet album by country singers Bonnie Owens and Merle Haggard with the Strangers. It was released in 1966 by Capitol Records.

Background
At the time of Haggard's first top-ten hit "(My Friends Are Gonna Be) Strangers" in 1965, Owens was actually the better known performer, a fixture on the Bakersfield club scene who had recorded and appeared on television. Bonnie, who had been married to Buck Owens, won the new Academy of Country Music's first ever award for Female Vocalist after her 1965 debut album, Don't Take Advantage of Me, hit the top five on the country albums chart. As Haggard recalls in the American Masters episode dedicated to him, Owens set her career aside to help make his name: "She had records in the charts and she was directly responsible for telling people, you know, 'You need to book this guy in Bakersfield because he's gonna be a star.' And they liked her so much that they tried me."

Haggard and Owens, who would eventually marry, scored a minor hit with the duet "Just Between the Two of Us" in 1965 on Tally Records. As part of the deal that got Haggard signed to Capitol, producer Ken Nelson obtained the rights to Haggard's Tally sides, including the duets with Owens, and in 1966 Just Between the Two of Us was released. The LP was a forerunner of the male-female country duet golden age that would emerge in the years ahead, featuring teams like Porter Wagoner and Dolly Parton, Conway Twitty and Loretta Lynn, and George Jones and Tammy Wynette.  However, there were no more hit singles, and although Owens recorded six solo albums on Capitol between 1965 and 1970, she became mainly known for her background harmonies on Haggard hits like "Sing Me Back Home" and "Branded Man".

Reception

Just Between the Two of Us hit number 4 on the country albums chart. In a retrospective review by Mark Deming for AllMusic, Deming wrote that the album is for "Haggard completists" and notes, "while Bonnie Owens was a good honky tonk singer, she was hardly a great one like Haggard, who seems to be holding himself back a bit musically as he defers to his spouse."

Track listing
"Just Between the Two of Us" (Liz Anderson) – 2:46
"A House Without Love is Not a Home" (Hank Williams) – 2:18
"Slowly But Surely" (Fuzzy Owen) – 2:23
"Our Hearts Are Holding Hands" (Bill Anderson) – 2:24
"I Wanta Live Again" (Fuzzy Owen) – 2:08
"Forever and Ever" (Buck Owens) – 2:07
"That Makes Two of Us" (Liz Anderson) – 2:05
"I'll Take a Chance on Loving You" (Buck Owens) – 2:47
"Stranger in My Arms" (Wallace Lewis, Fuzzy Owen) – 2:46
"Too Used to Being with You" (Don Carter, Jack Rhodes) – 2:03
"So Much for Me, So Much for You"  – 3:00
"Wait a Little Longer, Please Jesus" (Chester Smith) – 2:35

Personnel
Merle Haggard – vocals, guitar
Bonnie Owens – vocals

The Strangers:
Roy Nichols – guitar
Ralph Mooney – steel guitar
George French – piano
Jerry Ward – bass
Eddie Burris – drums

Chart positions

References

1966 albums
Merle Haggard albums
Capitol Records albums
Albums produced by Ken Nelson (United States record producer)